Milan High School can refer to:
 Milan High School (Indiana)
 Milan High School (Michigan)
 Milan High School (Tennessee)